Lynden Air Cargo is an American cargo airline based in Anchorage, Alaska, USA. It operates scheduled services and on demand charter, international and domestic flights, including services for the US military. Its main base is Ted Stevens Anchorage International Airport.

History 

The airline was established in 1995 and started operations on 31 August 1995. It began operation of Lockheed L-382 Hercules aircraft in 1997. It has 140 employees. The company has a Civil Reserve Air Fleet contract with the United States Department of Defense.

Destinations 

Lynden Air Cargo operates the following domestic scheduled freight services: Anchorage, Bethel, Kotzebue and Nome.

Fleet 
As of January 2022, the Lynden Air Cargo fleet includes:

References

External links 

Lynden Air Cargo
 Lynden Air Cargo Locations

Companies based in Anchorage, Alaska
Airlines based in Alaska
Airlines established in 1995
Cargo airlines of the United States
1995 establishments in Alaska